Qutallani (Aymara quta lake, -lla, -ni suffixes, "the one with a little lake", also spelled Kkotallani) is a  mountain in the Andes of Bolivia. It lies in the Oruro Department, Sajama Province, Turco Municipality. Qutallani is situated south-west of the mountains Chuqil Qamiri, Wintu Qachi and Wila Qullu.

References 

Mountains of Oruro Department